Kolet is a village in Mehravan Rural District, in the Central District of Neka County, Mazandaran Province, Iran. At the 2006 census, its population was 961, in 229 families.

References 

Populated places in Neka County